Harvey Albert Jason (born 29 February 1940) is an English actor and the co-owner of Mystery Pier Books, an independent book store that sells first editions.

Career
A character actor in films including The Gumball Rally and The Lost World: Jurassic Park, he also played in dozens of TV roles in the 1970s and 1980s, including Pinky in Rich Man, Poor Man and Harry Zief in Captains and the Kings, both made in 1976.

Personal life
Jason was born in London, the son of Marie Goldblatt and actor Alec Jason.

He is married to actress Pamela Franklin, whom he met in 1970 while making the film Necromancy, and with whom he has two sons. He is the proprietor of Mystery Pier Books in West Hollywood, California, which he operates with his son, Louis. They opened their shop and started listing on AbeBooks in 1998. A number of video interviews with Harvey Jason about his book store exist on YouTube, in particular a video made by filmmaker John D. McMahon.

Selected filmography

 Lilith (1964) as Patient (uncredited)
 The Girl from U.N.C.L.E. (1967, TV Series) as Cecil / Bebe / Terry Crump
 The Rat Patrol (1967, TV Series) as Perkins
 Batman (1967, TV Series) as Scudder
 Hallmark Hall of Fame (1967, TV Movie) as Herald
 Cowboy in Africa (1968, TV Series) as Albert
 Star! (1968) as Bert
 Gaily, Gaily (1969) as Quinn
 The Outcasts (1969, TV Series) as Limey
 The Flying Nun (1970, TV Series) as Fernando Morales
 Too Late the Hero (1970) as Signalman Scott
 The Young Rebels (1970, TV Series) as Corporal Davies
 Rowan & Martin's Laugh-In (1970–1971, TV Series) as Regular Performer
 Cold Turkey (1971) as Hypnotist
 Night Gallery (1972, TV Series) as Morrow (segment "The Funeral")
 Columbo: Dagger of the Mind (1972, TV Series) as The Director 
 Necromancy (1972) as Dr. Jay
 Save the Tiger (1973) as Rico
 Genesis II (1973, TV Series) as Singh
 Oklahoma Crude (1973) as Wilcox
 Sanford and Son (1973, TV Series) as Dr. Stewart
 Bob & Carol & Ted & Alice (1973, TV Series) as Gus
 The Streets of San Francisco (1974, TV Series) as Warburton
 Lost in the Stars (1974) as Arthur Jarvis
 Police Woman (1974, TV Seried) as Don
 Amy Prentiss (1975, TV Series) as Fleishman
 Harry O (1975, TV Series) as Dr. William Bronson
 Caribe (1975, TV Series) as Waite
 Cannon (1975, TV Series) as Terrorist
 The Specialist (1975) as Hardin Smith
 Dr. Minx (1975) as David Brown
 I Wonder Who's Killing Her Now? (1975) as Mr. Patlow
 Rich Man, Poor Man (1976, TV Mini-Series) as Pinky
 The Gumball Rally (1976) as Lapchik the Mad Hungarian - Kawasaki
 Captains and the Kings (1976, TV Mini-Series) as Haroun 'Harry' Zieff
 Charlie's Angels (1977, TV Series) as Alvin
 Man from Atlantis (1977, TV Series) as Dashki
 The Love Boat (1978, TV Series) as Howard Wilson
 Wonder Woman (1978, TV Series) as Professor Brubaker
 CHiPs (1978, TV Series) as Lee
 The French Atlantic Affair (1979, TV Mini-Series) as Plessier
 Archie Bunker's Place (1981, TV Series) as Mr. Freeman
 Bring 'Em Back Alive (1982-1983, TV Series) as Bhundi
 Trapper John, M.D. (1983, TV Series) as Martin Hopkins
 Airwolf (1984, TV Series) as Alexi Provov
 Crazy Like a Fox (1985, TV Series)
 The Fall Guy (1984-1985, TV Series) as Rudolph / Grant Llewellyn
 Scarecrow and Mrs. King (1985, TV Series) as James Brand
 Knight Rider (1986, TV Series) as Marco Berio
 Family Ties (1986, TV Series) as Pierre
 Bad Guys (1986) as Prof. Gimble
 Valerie (1986, TV Series) as Carlos
 You Again? (1986, TV Series) as Maitre d'
 The Wizard (1987, TV Series) as Redman
 Houston Knights (1987, TV Series)
 Star Trek: The Next Generation (1988, TV Series) as Felix Leech
 Night Court (1988, TV Series) as Maurice
 Oliver & Company (1988) (voice)
 Dynasty (1989, TV Series) as Ray Montana
 Hardball (1989, TV Series)
 Alien Nation (1990, TV Series) as Mr. Hopper
 The Platinum Triangle (1990) as Victor Kolter
 Air America (1990) as Nino
 White Palace (1990) (voice)
 Hi Honey – I'm Dead (1991, TV Movie) as Dr. Jahundi
 FernGully: The Last Rainforest (1992) (voice)
 L.A. Law (1993, TV Series) as Dr. Kaiser, Psychiatrist
 Picket Fences (1992-1994, TV Series) as Rabbi Barry Wald
 Diagnosis: Murder (1994, TV Series) as Stuart Westlake
 Seinfeld (1996, TV Series) as Auctioneer
 Street Corner Justice (1996) as Lou Wisceman
 The Lost World: Jurassic Park (1997) as Ajay Sidhu, the hunter
 The Curse of Monkey Island (1997, Video Game) as Cabana Boy / La Foot (voice)
 Star Wars: Force Commander (2000, Video Game) as AT-PT Driver / Medical Droid 2-1C (voice)
 Soul Survivors (2001)
 Star Wars: Galactic Battlegrounds (2001) as Empire transport ship captain / Royal lifter pilot (voice)

References

External links

 
 
 Lesson 1: Make Your Own Luck: Successful people create their own opportunities CNN Money

1940 births
English male film actors
English male television actors
Living people
Antiquarian booksellers
English expatriates in the United States